DePue High School, or DHS, is a public four-year high school located at 204 Pleasant Street in De Pue, Illinois, a village in Bureau County, Illinois, in the Midwestern United States. DHS serves the community and surrounding area of DePue. The campus is located 25 miles west of Ottawa, Illinois, and serves a mixed village and rural residential community. The village is 89% Hispanics/Latino.

Academics 

Potential reference/citation:

Athletics 
DePue High School, a member of the Tri-County Conference, and a member school in the Illinois High School Association. Their mascot is the Little Giants, with school colors of blue and orange. The school has no state championships on record in team athletics and activities.

Although DHS' possesses a small enrollment, they do not coop for sports, instead focusing on one sport per season: In the fall, Boys Soccer and Girls Volleyball; in the winter, Boys and Girls Basketball; in the spring, Boys and Girls Track and field and Girls Soccer.

History 

DePue High School has no known consolidations in the recent past. Surrounding communities may have possessed high schools at some time which were consolidated into the current DHS. Potential reference/citation:

References

External links 
 DePue Community Unit School District 103

Public high schools in Illinois
Schools in Bureau County, Illinois